"Can't Believe" is a duet by American recording artists Faith Evans and Carl Thomas. It was written and produced by Sean Combs and Mario Winans for Evans' third studio album Faithfully (2001) and is built around a sample of "Phone Tap" as performed by The Firm and penned by Nas, Anthony Cruz, Chris Taylor, Jermaine Baxter, and Dr. Dre.

The track appeared on Combs' Bad Boy compilation The Saga Continues... (2001) and was later released as the first single from Evans' album. Upon release, it reached number 54 on the US Billboard Hot 100 and number 14 on the US Billboard Hot R&B/Hip-Hop Songs chart. An accompanying music video was filmed by director Chris Robinson in 2001.

Format and track listing 
CD single
 "Can't Believe (Radio Mix) – 4:09 	
 "Can't Believe (Radio Mix featuring Shyne) – 4:09 	
 "Can't Believe (Instrumental) – 4:25 	
 "Can't Believe" (Call Out Research Hook) – 0:10

Credits and personnel 
Credits adapted from the liner notes of Keep the Faith.

 Executive producer – Sean "Puffy" Combs
 Associate executive producer – Harve "Joe Hooker" Pierre
 Instruments – Mario "Yellow Man" Winans
 Mixing – Rob Paustian
 Producer – Mario "Yellow Man" Winans, Sean "P. Diddy" Combs
 Recording – Rob Paustian

Charts

Weekly charts

Year-end charts

References

2001 singles
Faith Evans songs
2000 songs
Songs written by Sean Combs
Songs written by Nas
Songs written by Mario Winans
Songs written by Dr. Dre
Bad Boy Records singles
Male–female vocal duets